Puerto Aventuras is a community located in Solidaridad Municipality, Quintana Roo, Mexico. It is the second-largest community in Solidaridad Municipality, after the municipal seat, Playa del Carmen.

Puerto Aventuras is divided into two parts: west of Highway 307 is the residential subdivision, east of Highway 307 along the Caribbean coast is the tourist zone with hotels and resorts, part of the Riviera Maya.

Recreational activities 
Some of the recreational activities available in Puerto Aventuras include: golf, tennis, sportfishing, snorkeling, SCUBA diving, swimming with dolphins and manatees, and visiting some of the many nearby cenotes.

References

External links
 

Populated places in Quintana Roo
Solidaridad (municipality)